Sidney is a city in Fremont County, Iowa, United States. The population was 1,070 at the time of the 2020 census.  It is the county seat of Fremont County and is one of the smallest county seats in the state.

History
Sidney was laid out in 1851 and was originally to be named Dayton. The surveyors were boarding with the Milton Richards family.  Richards' wife suggested they rename the city for her hometown of Sidney, Ohio.

The Sidney Iowa Championship Rodeo, operated by American Legion Post No. 128 since 1924, claims to be the world's largest continuous outdoor rodeo and one of the world's largest rodeos with around 38,000 visitors each year. The event is held in late July/early August.

Geography
Sidney is located at 40°44'50" North, 95°38'49" West (40.747198, -95.646810).

Demographics

2010 census
As of the census of 2010, there were 1,138 people, 464 households, and 292 families living in the city. The racial makeup of the city was 96.8% White, 0.4% African American, 0.5% Native American, 0.2% Asian, 0.6% from other races, and 1.4% from two or more races. Hispanic or Latino of any race were 1.6% of the population.

There were 464 households, of which 32.1% had children under the age of 18 living with them, 44.6% were married couples living together, 13.1% had a female householder with no husband present, 5.2% had a male householder with no wife present, and 37.1% were non-families. 33.2% of all households were made up of individuals, and 16% had someone living alone who was 65 years of age or older. The average household size was 2.33 and the average family size was 2.86.

The median age in the city was 42.8 years. 23.3% of residents were under the age of 18; 6.3% were between the ages of 18 and 24; 22.9% were from 25 to 44; 26.4% were from 45 to 64; and 21.2% were 65 years of age or older. The gender makeup of the city was 48.4% male and 51.6% female.

2000 census
As of the census of 2000, there were 1,300 people, 491 households, and 330 families living in the city. The racial makeup of the city was 98.46% White, 0.08% Native American, 0.08% Asian, 1.15% from other races, and 0.23% from two or more races. Hispanic or Latino of any race were 2.38% of the population.

There were 491 households, out of which 34.4% had children under the age of 18 living with them, 53.6% were married couples living together, 11.2% had a female householder with no husband present, and 32.6% were non-families. 28.9% of all households were made up of individuals, and 18.3% had someone living alone who was 65 years of age or older. The average household size was 2.48 and the average family size was 3.05.

Population spread: 27.1% under the age of 18, 6.1% from 18 to 24, 24.2% from 25 to 44, 21.2% from 45 to 64, and 21.5% who were 65 years of age or older. The median age was 39 years. For every 100 females, there were 87.9 males. For every 100 females age 18 and over, there were 78.9 males.

The median income for a household in the city was $36,375, and the median income for a family was $45,278. Males had a median income of $30,292 versus $24,135 for females. The per capita income for the city was $15,027. About 6.6% of families and 9.7% of the population were below the poverty line, including 12.2% of those under age 18 and 16.3% of those age 65 or over.

Education
Sidney Community School District operates public schools.

Notable person

 Robert Birkby, adventure guide, author, photographer, speaker and trail designer

References

External links

 City of Sidney
 City-Data Comprehensive Statistical Data and more about Sidney

Cities in Iowa
Cities in Fremont County, Iowa
County seats in Iowa